Afro-Brazilian music' consists of a mixture of musical and cultural influences from Sub-Saharan Africa, Portugal, and on a smaller scale, Amerindian music, creating a large variety of styles. Lyrics, instruments, and even melodies often have connections to African culture and even influence culture and music in other countries today. It is strongly influenced by African rhythms. The most well known sub-genres of Afro-Brazilian musical genres are Samba, Marabaixo, maracatu, ijexá, coco, jongo, carimbó, lambada, maxixe, and maculelê.

Like every other part of the American continent where there were African slaves, music made by Afro-descendants was initially neglected and marginalized, until they gained their reputation at the beginning of the 20th century and became extremely popular in contemporary culture. This breakthrough came in part from the unique instruments that are used in Afro-Brazilian music including Afoxé, Agogô, Alfaia, Atabaque, Berimbau, and Tambor.

Nearly all Brazilian music is influenced by traces of Afro-Brazilian music, so much so that Letieres Leite, an Afro-Brazilian artist, claims that all Brazilian music is Afro-Brazilian.

Musicians 
There are many artists that influenced the Afro-Brazilian music and culture. Gilberto Gil is one of the most well-known Afro-Brazilian artists not only because of his award-winning music, but also because of his political activism. In his career he won two Grammys in the Best World Music Album category and received seven Grammy nominations. Other popular artists and groups include Pixinguinha, Abigail Moura, Nei Lopes, Agnaldo Timóteo, Racionais MC's and many more. These artists play many different genres including, but not limited to, samba, rap, jazz, rock, funk, reggae, and disco. Afro-Brazilian music was influenced by African instruments, rhythms, cultures, and beliefs that are still present in the day-to-day culture of Brazil.

Instruments 
The instruments used in Afro-Brazilian music vary depending on the genre being played. This being the case, a large amount of instruments exist that are unique to Afro-Brazilian music. These instruments include:

 Afoxé - The name of this instrument is of Yoruba origin and literally translates to "the language that makes it happen." The Afoxe was linked extremely closely to African ceremonies and to Candomble; so much so, that performances that use it are often referred to as "street Candomble."
 Agogô - A high pitched bell type instrument that stands out during a capoeira performance. It is used to compliment the rhythm of a capoeira match and can be heard in many variations of Samba music.
 Alfaia - The Alfaia is predominantly used in maracatu and Mangue beats. With origins in Pernambuco, Brazil, this drum is different from similar drums because if you tighten the ropes on the sides, you can change the tone of it.
 Atabaque- There are three different types of Atabaque. The tall Rum, the medium-sized Rum-Pi, and the smallest Le drums. The Atabaque are often used in capoeira and Maculele dances.
 Berimbau: The Berimbau is a single stringed instrument that is linked to the Afro-Brazilian martial art form of Capoeira. It produces a unique "twang" sound and can also be heard in Jazz and traditional folk music. 
 Pandeiro: The Pandeiro is very similar to a tambourine with symbols lining the side and a drum cover stretched around the face of it. A Pandeiro's drum face can be tuned to sound like a drum in a drum set. The pandeiro is mainly used in Samba, Choro, Coco, and Capoeira music.
 Reco-reco: The Reco-reco is a percussive instrument with heavy African influence that is very similar to the American instrument nicknamed "fish-scales." Used heavily in samba, it was traditionally made from bamboo sticks.
 Ganzá - Another percussive instrument of African origin. The Ganza is a shaking instrument that is typically made out of tin and compared to the Indian maraca or the African calabash. While a very simple instrument, it can perform rhythms as complex as the Bossa Nova.

Candomble 
The instruments and rhythms that constitute came directly from African traditions by the slaves brought to Brazil. Candomble is a tradition that became one of Brazil's oldest native religions. Candomble is one of the original uses that slaves had for the instruments and rhythms we identify today as Afro-Brazilian. In the tradition of Candomble there is great reverence for Afro-Brazilian instruments and rhythms. During ceremonies of candomble, instruments like the Atabaque and Agogô are used to appease the Orixas. There is believed to be a spiritual power to these instruments and rhythms that entrance the listener to become more available to commune with the Orixas. There are also specific drum patterns and rhythms that can be used to call, ban, and interact with the Orixas. Afro-Brazilian music that was made in the circles of candomble eventually spread to help create early Samba. Candomble was seen as an inappropriate practice by the slave owners and majority of Brazil. In Candomble, dancing and music are sacred, so meetings would be disguised as parties to evade intervention. It was at these parties hosted by Tios and Tias (priests in Candomble) where the first samba beats and dances were originated in the peripheries of Rio de Janeiro.

Capoeira 

Capoeira's influence on Afro-Brazilian music is wide. There are many different types of capoeira performances, each one with a different beat to accompany the martial art. A few of these beats are:

 Traditional Candomble - A performance created by Mestre Bimba, creator of the regional capoeira school of thought, which reflects on candomble and the spiritual nature of music and dancing and uses many of Candomble's own beats and dance moves to perform. 
 Samba roda - Uses some of the earliest versions of Samba to pair with folkloric dances from both Africa and Brazil.
 Banguela de Regional - This is a beat created by Mestre Bimba to mimic the "Capoeira Angola" style. These types of performances are over much slower and low beats which came to represent early stages of jazz.
 Os Toques da Regional - This track includes the seven main beats of the "Capoeira Regional" style. The inclusion of many different beats for one performance is considered a microcosm of Brazil as a whole.
 As Quadras e Os corridos da Regional - These types of songs include significantly more chanting than the previous styles. The "quadras" are chants that start the performance and the "corridos" are chants that keep the energy and rhythm of the performance fast and energetic. 
 O Hino da Grupo Ginga -  Mestre Bimba said of  O Hino da Grupo Ginga "This song, played to the traditional Regional rhythm, "São Bento Grande", is Ginga Capoeira's anthem. It tells of Ginga Capoeira's origins, celebrates our presence in the world of Capoeira, and calls upon all who support and challenge us."

References 

African music
Brazilian music